The 1916 Edinburgh and St Andrews Universities by-election was held on 29 December 1916.  The by-election was held due to the appointment as Lord Chancellor of the incumbent Conservative MP, Sir Robert Finlay.  It was won by the Conservative candidate Christopher Nicholson Johnston. who was unopposed due to a War-time electoral pact.

References

1916 in Scotland
1910s elections in Scotland
1916 elections in the United Kingdom
University
Unopposed by-elections to the Parliament of the United Kingdom (need citation)
1910s in Edinburgh
History of the University of Edinburgh
University of St Andrews
By-elections to the Parliament of the United Kingdom in Edinburgh and St Andrews Universities
December 1916 events